Coleophora dissociella is a moth of the family Coleophoridae. It is found in Canada, including Nova Scotia.

References

dissociella
Moths described in 1955
Moths of North America